Cristatopalpus is a monotypic moth genus of the family Erebidae. Its only species, Cristatopalpus olivens, is found in New Guinea. Both the genus and the species were first described by George Thomas Bethune-Baker in 1908.

The Global Lepidoptera Names Index gives this name as a synonym of Crenotermes Hampson.

References

Herminiinae
Monotypic moth genera